

Summary

Timeline
The following is a timeline of the qualification events for the equestrian events at the 2016 Summer Olympics.

Dressage

Team

Individual

Eventing

Team

Individual 

* With Canada and the United States being the only nations eligible to compete in the individual eventing, no other rider from the North America and Caribbean continent is registered to Group D; thus, the unused berth has been redistributed to the next rider in the Individual Olympic Rankings.

Jumping

Team

Individual

References

Equestrian at the 2016 Summer Olympics
Qualification for the 2016 Summer Olympics